Pedro Elviro Rodríguez (died 24 August 1971), also known as Pitouto, was a Spanish actor. Between 1924 and 1972, he shot more than 170 films, a good part of them in France and Mexico.

Selected filmography
 The Darling of Paris (1931) as Author's assistant
 Le Million (1931) as Stage manager
 Mistigri (1931)
 The Unknown Singer (1931)
 The Train of Suicides (1931) as Nobody, the clown
 A Gentleman in Tails (1931)
 The Woman Dressed As a Man (1932)
 The Champion Cook (1932) as Achille
 Sailor's Song (1932) as Jeff
 The Picador (1932)
 Fog (1932)
 Ciboulette (1933) as Arthur et Meyer
 High and Low (1933) as Bretzel, the sweeper
 Le Roi des Champs-Élysées (1934)
 The Crisis is Over (1934) as Hercule
 La Bandera (1935) as Floor boy
 Rigolboche (1936)
 The Puritan (1938) as Security Officer
 The Unknown Policeman (1941) as Secuaz de Riquelme
 The Three Musketeers (1942) as Mesero / Posadero 
 The Circus (1943)
 Romeo and Juliet (1943)
 Mischievous Susana (1945) as Mesero
 A Day with the Devil (1945)
 Boom in the Moon (1946)
 María Magdalena: Pecadora de Magdala (1946) as Man mocking Jesus
 I Am a Fugitive (1946) as Esbirro chaparro del jefe
 Five Faces of Woman (1947) as Gendarme
 The Private Life of Mark Antony and Cleopatra (1947) as Ministro Egipcio
 Fly Away, Young Man! (1947) as Periodista
 Reina de reinas: La Virgen María (1948) as Man mocking Jesus
 The Genius (1948) as Empleado corte
 The Doorman (1950) as Don Fortino
 Over the Waves (1950) as Levy, prestamist
 Serenade in Acapulco (1951) Huesped hotel
 Full Speed Ahead (1951) as Mendigo
 Red Fury (1951) as Miembro de la corte
 If I Were a Congressman (1952) as Amigo del barbero 
 Mexican Bus Ride (1952)
 The Atomic Fireman (1952) as Secretario
 Mercy (1953) as Limosnero
 The Bachelors (1953)
 Pepe the Bull (1953) as Abogado
 The Photographer (1953) as Novio fotografiado
 A Tailored Gentleman (1954) as Secretario de comisaría 
 Bluebeard as Empleado de don Agustín
 Puss Without Boots (1957) as Hombre en estadio
 Sube y baja (1959)
 Rebel Without a House (1960) as Cuidador
 Pegando con tubo (1961)

References

External links
 

1971 deaths
People from the Province of Cáceres
Spanish male film actors
20th-century Spanish male actors
Spanish emigrants to France
Spanish emigrants to Mexico